Cara Black was the defending champion, but did not compete this year.

Jelena Dokic won the title by defeating Katarina Srebotnik 6–4, 6–2 in the final.

Seeds

Draws

Finals

Top half

Section 1

Section 2

Bottom half

Section 3

Section 4

References
 ITF tournament profile
 Unofficial results archive (since Quarterfinals)

Girls' Singles
US Open, 1998 Girls' Singles